The Durham University Observatory is a weather observatory owned and operated by the University of Durham. It is a Grade II listed building located at Potters Bank, Durham and was founded in 1839 initially as an astronomical and meteorological observatory (owing to the need to calculate refraction from the air temperature) by Temple Chevallier, until 1937 when the observatory moved purely to meteorological recording.

The observatory's current director is Professor Tim Burt of the Geography Department, who is also Master of Hatfield College.

After the Radcliffe Observatory, Durham has the longest unbroken meteorological record of any University in the UK, with records dating back to the 1840s, principally due to the work of Gordon Manley in creating a temperature record that would be comparable to Oxford's. At present the observatory contributes to the Met Office's forecasts by providing automated records.

Former observers
1840 – 1841 Temple Chevallier
1841 John Stewart Browne
1842 – 1846 Arthur Beanlands
1846 – 1849 Robert Anchor Thompson
1849 Le Jeune
1849 Robert Healey Blakey (acting)
1849 – 1852 Richard Carrington
1852 – 1853 William Ellis
1854 – 1855 Georg Friedrich Wilhelm Rümker
1856 – 1863 Albert Marth
1863 – 1864 Edward Gleadowe Marshall
1865 – 1867 Mondeford Reginald Dolman
1867 – 1874 John Isaac Plummer
1874 – 1885 Gabriel Alphonsus Goldney
1885 – 1900 Henry James Carpenter
1900 – 1919 Frederick Charles Hampshire Carpenter
1919 – 1938 Frank Sargent
1938 – 1939 E. Gluckauf
1940 – 1945 A. Beecroft
1945 – 1948 L. S. Joyce
1949 – 1951 K. F. and G. A. Chackett
1951 – 1957 J. Musgrave
1957 – 1968 F. and D. Glockling
1969 – 1990 A. Warner

References

External links
 Archived Observatory Homepage
 Current Observatory Homepage
 News Article on rising temperatures at Durham
 Observatory, Potters Bank, Durham; Listed building (Durham City)
 Durham Observatory – Durham (UNITED KINGDOM)

Buildings and structures of Durham University
Astronomical observatories in England
1839 establishments in England
Meteorological observatories
Anthony Salvin buildings